Luže is a town in Chrudim District in the Pardubice Region of the Czech Republic. It has about 2,600 inhabitants. The historic centre is well preserved and is protected by law as an urban monument zone.

Administrative parts

Town parts of Košumberk and Zdislav and villages of Bělá, Brdo, Dobrkov, Doly, Domanice, Rabouň, Radim, Srbce and Voletice are administrative parts of Luže.

Geography
It lies in the Svitavy Uplands. It is situated on the right bank of the river Novohradka. The Krounka River flows into the Novohradka in the southern part of the municipal territory. Voletický Pond is located in the northern part.

History
The first indirect mention of Luže is from 1250, when an old settlement called Kamenicza joined with the newly established Luza. The first clear written mention of Luže is from 1349. A deed from 1372 referred to Luže as a market town.

The history of Luže is closely linked with the Košumberk Castle. From the 14th century, Luže was part of the manor of lords of Chlum and Košumberk, later Slavatas of Chlum and Košumberk. In the 15th century, Luže slowly developed and benefited from the fact that it was not affected by the Hussite Wars much. In 1690, After the Slavata family became extinct, the manor was donated to the Society of Jesus. Its last owner until the World War I was the House of Thurn und Taxis.

The Jewish community in Luže is documented from the second half of the 16th century. At its peak in the mid-19th century, it created 18% of the population. Already in 1930, it almost disappeared and after the World War II, it was not renewed.

Economy
The Hamza Hospital is the main employer based in the town. In 1901, the Hamza Sanatorium was founded in Luže by František Hamza. It was the first sanatorium in Central Europe for children suffering from tuberculosis. The first buildings of the hospital complex were built in 1907. In 1962 the treatment of tuberculosis patients stopped and the hospital focused upon the rehabilitation of patients with mobility impairments. Since 1990, it treats both children and adult patients.

Sights

Nowadays the ruin of the Košumberk Castle is the property of the town of Luže. There is an exhibition on the history of the castle and town.

The Pilgrimage Church of the Virgin Mary on the hill Chlumek was founded by Countess Mary Maximiliana Eva of Žďár. She had built the church at her own expense. It was built in the Baroque style in 1690–1695.

The Church of Saint Bartholomew was first mentioned in 1350. Despite an extensive reconstruction in the 19th century, some parts maintained the original Gothic style. Within the church, several tombstones are preserved, such as the tombstone of Diviš Slavata of Chlum and Košumberk.

The synagogue building from the 18th century has been renewed. The building is now owned by the Jewish community of Prague and serves cultural purposes. A large Jewish cemetery about 1 km north of Luže has tombs dating back to the 17th century.

References

External links

Cities and towns in the Czech Republic
Populated places in Chrudim District